Franklin Towers is a 16-story high-rise building located in Portland, Maine, at the corner of Franklin Street and Cumberland Avenue, rising to a height of . Construction was completed in 1969, and its primary use is residential.

It affords residency, administered by the Portland Housing Authority (PHA), to people who meet criteria such as retirement age, disability, and limited income. Through PHA, residents pay up to 30% of their adjusted income for rent.  It is the tallest residential building, and the fourth tallest overall in the state.

See also 

 List of tallest buildings in Maine

References

Residential buildings completed in 1969
Apartment buildings in Portland, Maine
Residential skyscrapers in Maine
1969 establishments in Maine
Brutalist architecture in Maine